Nyctemera toxopei is a moth of the family Erebidae first described by van Eecke in 1929. It is found on Buru in Indonesia.

References

Nyctemerina
Moths described in 1929